Parasisis is a monotypic genus of Asian dwarf spiders containing the single species, Parasisis amurensis. It was first described by K. Y. Eskov in 1984, and has only been found in Russia, China, Korea, and Japan.

See also
 List of Linyphiidae species (I–P)

References

Linyphiidae
Monotypic Araneomorphae genera
Spiders of Asia
Spiders of Russia